Adivarapupeta is a village in the East Godavari district of the Indian state of Andhra Pradesh. Shivabalayogi was born in the village and did twelve years of meditation. His mahasamadhi was done in his Ashram at the village.

Culture
The Shivabalayogi ashram includes a temple which houses the Shiva Lingam and statue of Parvati Devi that Shivabalayogi installed on the place where he sat for almost ten of his twelve-year tapas. The temple measures 86 feet by 46 feet and its dome reaches 45 feet high. Adjacent is the Samadhi mausoleum where Shivabalayogi's body is interred.

Notes

References
 ‘‘Shri Shri Shri Shivabalayogi Maharaj: Life & Spiritual Ministration’’ by Lt. Gen. Hanut Singh (India 1980, reprinted India 2008).
 ‘‘Tapas Shakti’’ by Thomas L. Palotas (India, 1991).
 ‘‘Swamiji's Treasure: God Realization & Experiences of Shivabalayogi’’ by Thomas L. Palotas (Lulu, 2007).
 ‘‘Divine Play: the Silent Teaching of Shiva Bala Yogi’’ by Thomas L. Palotas (Lotus Press, 2006).

Villages in East Godavari district